Schafter (stylized minuscule: schafter), actually Wojciech Laskowski (born 2003), is a Polish rapper, singer, music producer, music video director and songwriter.

Early life 
Laskowski was born in Racibórz, Poland in 2003. Schafter grew up in Jaworzno and initially dealt with production.

Career 
The first song with vocals "dead in designer clothes" he created in June 2016 and published it on SoundCloud under the pseudonym "restaurantposse 🌟". Already as a producer, he published his productions on the YouTube channel "Kstyk". On October 31, his debut mini-album "hors d'oeuvre" was released. The distribution of the recording in physical form was handled by Asfalt Records.

On May 24, 2019 the song "hot coffee" was released on schafter's channel, an announcement of the new album. The song resonated widely and became the hit of the summer. On November 22, 2019, the album "audiotele" was released on streaming and in stores, with guest appearances by, among others Taco Hemingway, Żabson or Belmondo. The album took 2nd place on OLiS. Universal Music was responsible for the physical release of the album.

On March 12, 2020 a joint song by Young Igi and schafter called "swimming lessons" was released. The song itself was not considered a single from the album, but was eventually included on it. About a year after its premiere, the song was certified gold.

On June 23, 2020 the single "push to talk" was released, which was the announcement of the album "FUTURA", available in stores and streaming services from November 27, 2020 (people who pre-ordered it had the opportunity to listen to the songs the day before ). The album took 6th place on OLiS, and the album itself featured such people as Rosalie, Houston X and Young Igi.

On March 24, 2021 the artist's most popular single "hot coffee" was awarded a diamond award.

Discography 
Studio albums

EP

Singles

Other listed or certified songs

Guest appearances

References 

2003 births
Living people
Polish musicians
Polish hip hop musicians
Polish rappers
21st-century rappers